The acronym OAF may refer to:

 Associação Académica de Coimbra – O.A.F., a professional football team in Coimbra, Portugal
 ÖAF, an Austrian car and truck brand
 Oak Flats railway station in New South Wales, station code OAF
 Open Accessibility Framework, a high-level design for handicapped-accessible computer equipment and programs
 Oracle Application Framework, a software framework developed by Oracle Corporation for application development

See also
 Changeling
 
 OFE (disambiguation)